John Massaro may refer to:

 John Massaro (born 1957), American conductor, pianist, composer, and opera director
 John R. Massaro (born 1930), US marine
 John Massaro (guitarist) (fl. 1970s–1980s), Steve Miller Band

See also
Massari (disambiguation)
Massaro, a surname